Modeeria is a genus of hydrozoans belonging to the family Tiarannidae.

The genus has cosmopolitan distribution.

Species:

Modeeria irenium 
Modeeria rotunda 
Modeeria sagamina

References

Tiarannidae
Hydrozoan genera